Tamás Viczay de Loós was a Hungarian nobleman, who served as Count of Sopron County from 1347 to 1360. He was a member of the Viczay de Loós family (later Baron, then Count de Loós et Hédervár).

He had a son, named János (1368–1394).

External links
 

Tamas